Behind the Evidence is a science fiction novel by authors Amelia Reynolds Long and William L. Crawford writing under the pseudonym Peter Reynolds. It was published in 1936 by the Visionary Publishing Company in an edition of 100 copies.

Plot introduction
The novel concerns conspiracy theories and a case similar to the Lindbergh kidnapping but set in a fictional Germanic country.

References

1936 American novels
1936 science fiction novels
American science fiction novels
Collaborative novels
Works published under a pseudonym